Village Christian School (VCS) is a private, K-12 Christian school located in Sun Valley, Los Angeles, California. 

The school was founded in 1949 by members of The Village Church in nearby Burbank. Their mascot is the Crusader.  Village Christian has a total enrollment of approximately 1,100 students, K-12 Grades.

History 
Founded in 1949, Village Christian School has provided a Christian education in the Greater Los Angeles area for more than 64 years. From its beginnings in a small church building with only 40 elementary students, VCS has grown to approximately 1,100 students (K-12) on a 110-acre campus, 30 of which are developed.
Village Christian School was founded by Pastor Phil Gibson, pastor of The Village Christian Church in Burbank.  The original vision was that the School would serve as an outreach to the community by providing quality private education at an affordable price. Today Village admits students and families with varying faiths and backgrounds. 
The school started in the buildings of Village Church in Burbank. In 1957, the Board of Directors authorized the purchase of the current property on Penrose and Village Avenue. 
Since that initial ground-breaking, Village Christian has continued to grow and at one time was the largest Christian School on one campus west of the Mississippi River. The school continues to add buildings and programs.

Academic achievement 
-In 2003, Village Christian School was named a National Blue Ribbon School of Excellence by the United States Department of Education.

-In 2019, students passed 73% of all AP exams administered, performing notably better than national averages in many subject areas

-In 2019 alone, there were 601 Total College Acceptances, $9 Million in Scholarships, 11 Perfect Scores on SAT/ACT Test Sections, and 45 CSF Sealbearers

-In 2017, every single student in the graduating class was accepted into at least one four-year school.

-In 2016, 262 AP exams were administered to 140 students with a 68% exam passing rate of 3 or better.

Media Acclaim 
-Readers' Choice School (Los Angeles Times)

-Best Private School in Burbank (News-Press Leader)

-Favorite School (Los Angeles Daily News)

-Best Deal in Education (KCAL Channel 9, KTLA Channel 5)

Academic accreditations  
Village Christian School is accredited by WASC (Western Association of Schools and Colleges, one of six regional associations that accredit public and private secondary school colleges, and universities in the United States. Village Christian Schools is accredited by CESA (Council on Educational Standards and Accountability) Village Christian School is the first California school to be admitted as a Member of Council to the CESA organization.

Memberships
California Scholarship Federation (CSF)
California Interscholastic Federation, Southern Section (CIF)
National Association of Secondary School Principals (NASSP)
College Board
California Interscholastic Society (CIS)
International Scholarship Federation (ISF)
Council on Educational Standards and Accountability (CESA)

References

External links
http://www.villagechristian.org/documents/Academics/Counseling/Profile-2017-2018.pdf

Christian schools in California
Private high schools in California
Private middle schools in California
Private elementary schools in California
Preparatory schools in California
1949 establishments in California